Lieutenant General Jai Singh Nain PVSM, AVSM,  SM, ADC was the former General Officer-Commanding-in-Chief (GOC-in-C) Southern Command of the Indian Army. He assumed the post from Lieutenant-General Chandi Prasad Mohanty.

Career 
Nain was commissioned into the 2nd battalion of the Dogra Regiment in June 1983. He is a graduate of the Defence Services Staff College, Wellington, the College of Defence Management, Secunderabad and the National Defence College (Bangladesh).

Nain has served as a United Nations military observer with the UN mission in Iraq and Kuwait.
He is the alumnus of Sainik School Kunjpura, Karnal Haryana. and belongs to 62nd course Hunter Squadron of National Defence Academy Khadakwasla Pune

Decorations

Dates of rank

References 

Living people
Indian generals
Recipients of the Ati Vishisht Seva Medal
Indian Army officers
Recipients of the Sena Medal
Year of birth missing (living people)
National Defence Academy (India) alumni
National Defence College (Bangladesh) alumni
College of Defence Management alumni
Defence Services Staff College alumni